Colonel Sir William Henry Houghton Gastrell  (24 September 1852 – 11 April 1935) was Conservative MP for Lambeth North.

He was born in Gloucestershire and educated at Cheltenham College. He moved to London where he obtained a commission in the Middlesex Yeomanry, rising to the rank of major and second in command of the unit in 1901.  In 1909 he was awarded the Territorial Decoration.  He was subsequently promoted to the rank of colonel in the Army Service Corps commanding Woolwich District.

He was a member of London County Council for St Pancras South from 1904 to 1907 for the Moderates, forerunners of the Municipal Reform Party.  He previously stood unsuccessfully in 1901.

He stood unsuccessfully in Lambeth North in 1906, won the seat from the Liberals in January 1910, held it in December 1910, but lost it to them in 1918.

He was knighted in 1917.

Sources

Members of London County Council
Royal Army Service Corps officers
1935 deaths
Conservative Party (UK) MPs for English constituencies
1852 births
People educated at Cheltenham College
Middlesex Yeomanry officers
People from Gloucestershire
Knights Bachelor
Imperial Yeomanry officers
Companions of the Order of St Michael and St George
Fellows of the Royal Geographical Society
British Army personnel of the Second Boer War
British Army personnel of World War I